The thriving new wave of the Cambodian film industry which began in 2003 comes to an end leaving 2007 with a little over half the number of films produced in 2006, 44 films.

2007

See also
2007 in Cambodia

2007
Films
Cambodian